Disney Channel is a Spanish-managed Portuguese pay television channel, owned and operated by The Walt Disney Company Iberia. It was launched on 28 November 2001 as a premium channel, and it was later added to basic packages across platforms. It also broadcast through Angola and Mozambique via ZAP.

Programming

Disney Channel airs some live action shows subtitled in Portuguese and others dubbed, animated series, short series, Disney XD (Spain), and films.

Since July 2013, most Disney Channel and Disney XD original shows are broadcast with dual audio channels, Portuguese or English, using MPEG2 and AAC standards, respectively.

Audiences

As of October 2012, Disney Channel Portugal has disputed the leadership of subscription television ratings, in terms of daily average, with Canal Hollywood, finishing second for all but one week. However, it was the channel with most shows on the top 15 along the month, ranging from five to nine shows per week.

Disney Channel is the most watched children's channel and the 4th most watched channel in Portugal.

References

External links
 Official website
 Official schedule
  @disneychannelportugal
  Disney Channel PT

Portugal
Television stations in Portugal
Television channels and stations established in 2001
2001 establishments in Portugal
Television channels in Angola
Television channels in Mozambique
Television stations in Cape Verde